Bernardas Brazdžionis (1907 January 11 in Stebeikėliai - 2002 July 11 in Los Angeles) was a Lithuanian poet. Bernardas Brazdžionis also used various pen names, such as  Vytė Nemunėlis, Jaunasis Vaidevutis.

Biography

Bernardas Brazdžionis was born in Stebeikėliai in 1907, however, after one year Brazdžionis' family emigrated to United States. Brazdžionis along with his family stayed in the US until 1914 when they returned to Lithuania. Bernardas Brazdžionis finished Biržai gymnasium in 1929, soon after graduation, he enrolled in Vytautas Magnus University, which Brazdžionis finished in 1934.

Bernardas Brazdžionis helped to copyread various Lithuanian journals and papers, like  Ateities spinduliai, Pradalgės. He also wrote critiques of various books. In 1939 Bernardas Brazdžionis was awarded with the State literature prize for his poetry book Kunigaikščių miestas. In 1944 Bernardas Brazdžionis moved to Germany, where he lived until 1949. Brazdžionis finally settled in the US, actively participating in Lithuanian community activities. Patriotic songs based on his poems were performed during the Singing Revolution in Lithuania; the complete edition of Brazdžionis' poetry Poezijos pilnatis was sold with great success and reached big popularity.  Bernardas Brazdžionis died in Los Angeles, 2002 and in the same year was reburied in Kaunas Petrašiūnai Cemetery.
Brazdžionis was a member of the Catholic youth and student organization Ateitis.

References
Biography of Bernardas Brazdžionis. Retrieved on 2007-09-27

Lithuanian male poets
1907 births
2002 deaths
Vytautas Magnus University alumni
20th-century poets
Burials at Petrašiūnai Cemetery